The 2007–08 Croatian First Football League (officially known as the T-Com Prva HNL for sponsorship reasons) was the seventeenth season of the Croatian First Football League, the national championship for men's association football teams in Croatia, since its establishment in 1992. The season started on 20 July 2007 and ended on 10 May 2008. Dinamo Zagreb were the defending champions, having won their eleventh championship title the previous season, and they defended the title again, after a win against Međimurje on 12 April 2008.

Promotion and relegation
Kamen Ingrad were automatically relegated to Druga HNL as they finished last in the previous season, while Inter Zaprešić were automatically promoted from Druga HNL after winning the 2006–07 title. In a two-legged playoff between Zadar and Pula, Zadar were promoted to Prva HNL by beating Pula with 6–2 on aggregate (3–0, 3–2).

Teams

Stadia and personnel

 1 On final match day of the season, played on 10 May 2008.

League table

Results

Matchdays 1–22
In the first part of the season, matchdays 1–22 were played, with each team playing against every other team twice (home and away). This part of the season started on 20 July 2007, and finished with the last round matches on 8 March 2008.

Matches 23–33
In the second part of the season, matchdays 23–33 were played, with each team playing every other team one additional time (either at home or away). This part of the season started with matchday 23 on 15 March 2008, and finished with the last round on 10 May 2008.

Relegation play-off
Following the end of season, a home-and-away relegation/promotion play-off was contested between Inter Zaprešić (11th placed team in the First League) and Hrvatski Dragovoljac (2nd placed team in the 2007–08 Second Football League). Matches were played on 17 and 21 May 2008, with Inter Zaprešić retaining their top level status by beating Hrvatski Dragovoljac 2–0 on aggregate.

First leg

Second leg

Top goalscorers

See also 
2007–08 Croatian Football Cup
2007–08 Croatian Second Football League

References

External links
Season statistics at HRNogomet
2007–08 in Croatian Football at Rec.Sport.Soccer Statistics Foundation

Croatian Football League seasons
Cro
Prva Hnl, 2007-08